Badarawa is a town located in Kaduna city under Kaduna North local government area. it was bordered by Unguwan Sarki, Unguwan Dosa, Malali and Nigerian Defence Academy, Kaduna.

Geographical locations 
It consists of some small towns: Kwaru, Malali, Majalisa, Unguwan Yaro, Unguwan Shekara, Unguwan Bado and Unguwan mai samari. The whole of Badarawa is subdivided into two: Badarawa village and Badarawa G.R.A.

Government and rulers

It has only two leaders, a traditional ruler called Mai-anguwa or Sarkin Badarawa and an Electoral leader called Councillor.

Health and education 
The town has L.E.A government primary school called L.E.A Badarawa where people of the place study Western education. They also have a primary health care.

Notable people 

 Mohammed Inuwa Wushishi

External links 

Kaduna State Media Corporation 
Official State Government Website

References

Populated places in Kaduna State
Towns in Nigeria